Mohamed Barakatullah Bhopali, known with his honorific as Maulana Barkatullah (7 July 1854 – 20 September 1927), was an Indian revolutionary from Bhopal. Barkatullah was born on 7 July 1854 at Itawra mohalla, Bhopal in Madhya Pradesh, India. He fought from outside India, with fiery speeches and revolutionary writings in leading newspapers, for the independence of India. He did not live to see India independent. He died at San Francisco in 1927 and buried at Sacramento City Cemetery California. In 1988, Bhopal University was renamed Barkatullah University in his honour. He was also Prime Minister of first Provisional Government of India established at Afghanistan in 1915.

Policy of revolution
While in England he came in close contact with Lala Hardayal and Raja Mahendra Pratap, son of the Raja of Hathras. He became a friend of Afghan Emir and the editor of the Kabul newspaper Siraj-ul-Akbar. He was one of the founders of the Ghadar Party in 1913 at San Francisco. Later he became the first prime minister of the Provisional Government of India established on 1 December 1915 in Kabul with Raja Mahendra Pratap as its president.

In England, in 1897, Barakatullah was seen attending meetings of the Muslim Patriotic League. Here, he came across other revolutionary compatriots around Shyamji Krishnavarma. After about a year spent in America, in February 1904 he left for Japan, where he was appointed Professor of Hindustani at the University of Tokyo. In the autumn of 1906, at 1 West 34th Street in New York City, a Pan-Aryan Association was formed by Barakatullah and Samuel Lucas Joshi, a Maratha Christian, son of the late Reverend Lucas Maloba Joshi; it was supported by the Irish revolutionaries of the Clan-na-Gael, the anti-British lawyer Myron H. Phelps and of the equally anti-British Swami Abhedananda who continued the work of Swami Vivekananda.

According to a report in the Gaelic American, in June 1907, a meeting of Indians, held in New York, passed resolutions "repudiating the right of any foreigner (Mr. Morley) to dictate the future of the Indian people, urging their countrymen to depend upon themselves alone and especially on boycott and swadeshi, condemning the deportation of Lajpat Rai and Ajit Singh, and expressing detestation of the action of the British authorities in openly instigating one class of Indians against another at Jamalpur and other places." (Source: Ker, p225).

More vehement was his letter in Persian, which appeared in the Urdu Mualla of Aligarh, U.P., in May 1907, in which Barakatullah strongly advocated the necessity for unity between Hindus and Muslims, and defined the two chief duties of Muslims as patriotism and friendship with all Muslims outside India. This prophetic argument preceded by four years the publication of Germany and the Coming War, by Bernhardi, warning England to be aware of the extreme danger represented by the unity of Hindu and Muslim extremists in Bengal, as reported by the Rowlatt Commission (Chapter VII).  He thought that the performance of both these duties depended entirely upon one rule of conduct, namely concord and unity with the Hindus of India in all political matters. (Ker, p226).

On 16 August 1908 arrived from Kolkata Bhupendra Nath Datta, Vivekananda's hot-blooded brother. Invited by George Freeman to edit the Free Hindustan from the Gaelic American newspaper office, Taraknath Das went to New York to join his old colleague Datta. In March 1909 Barakatullah left again for Japan.

Activities in Japan
Early in 1910, he started the Islamic Fraternity in Tokyo.

In June–July 1911 he left for Constantinople and Petrograd, returned to Tokyo in October and published an article referring to the advent of a great pan-Islamic Alliance including Afghanistan which he expected to become  "the future Japan of Central Asia". In December he converted to Islam three Japanese: his assistant Hassan Hatanao, his wife, and her father, Baron Kentaro Hiki. This is said to be the first conversion to Islam in Japan. In 1912, Barakatullah "became at once more fluent in his use of the English language and more anti-British in his tone", observes Ker (p133). Discussing in his paper the "Christian Combination against Islam", Barakatullah singled out the Emperor William of Germany as really the one man "who holds the peace of the world as well as the war in the hollow of his hand : it is the duty of the Muslims to be united, to stand by the Khalif; with their life and property, and to side with Germany".  Quoting a Roman poet, Barakatullah reminded that the Anglo-Saxons had been sea-wolves, living on the pillage of the world. The difference in modern times was the added "refinement of hypocrisy which sharpens the edge of brutality". On 6 July 1912, the entry of the paper into India was prohibited, before the Japanese Government suppressed it. Meanwhile, since September, copies of another paper called El Islam appeared in India, continuing Barakatullah's political propaganda. On 22 March 1913 its importation was prohibited in India. In June 1913, copies were received in India of a lithographed Urdu pamphlet, "The Sword is the Last Resort". On 31 March 1914 Barakatullah's teaching appointment was terminated by the Japanese authorities. It was followed by another similar leaflet, Feringhi ka Fareb ("The Deceit of the English") : according to Ker (p135), "it surpassed in violence Barakatullah’s previous productions, and was modelled more on the style of the publications of the Ghadar party of San Francisco with whom Barakatullah now threw in his lot".

The Ghadar episode

In May 1913, G. D. Kumar had sailed from San Francisco for the Philippines and had written from Manila to Tarak Nath Das: "I am going to establish base at Manila (P.I.) forwarding Depôt, supervise the work near China, Hong Kong, Shanghai. Professor Barakatullah is all right in Japan". (Ker, p237). On 22 May 1914, Barakatullah returned to San Francisco with Bhagwan Singh (alias Natha Singh), the granthi (priest) of the Sikh temple at Hong Kong and joined the Yugantar Ashram and worked with Tarak Nath Das. With the outbreak of the War in August 1914, meetings were held at all the principal centres of the Indian population from Asia in California and Oregon and funds were raised to go back to India and join the insurrection : Barakatullah, Bhagwan Singh and Ram Chandra Bharadwaj were among the speakers. (Portland (Oregon) Telegram, 7 August 1914; Fresno Republican, 23 September 1914). Reaching Berlin on time, Barakatullah met Chatto or Virendranath Chattopadhyaya and sided Raja Mahendra Pratap in the Mission to Kabul. Their role was significant in indoctrinating with anti-British feelings the Indian prisoners of war held by Germany.  They arrived at Herat on 24 August 1915 and were given a royal reception by the Governor.

Government of Free India

On 1 December 1915, Pratap's 28th birthday, he established the first Provisional Government of India at Kabul in Afghanistan, during First World War. It was a government-in-exile of Free Hindustan with Raja Mahendra Pratap as president, Maulana Barkatullah, Prime Minister, Ubaidullah Sindhi, Home Minister. Anti-British forces supported his movement. But, for some obvious loyalty to the British, the Amir kept on delaying the expedition.
Then they attempted to establish relations with foreign powers". (Ker, p305).  In Kabul, the Siraj-ul-Akhbar in its issue of 4 May 1916 published Raja Mahendra Pratap's version of the Mission and its objective. He stated: "His Imperial Majesty the Kaiser himself granted me an audience. Subsequently, having set right the problem of India and Asia with the Imperial German Government, and having received the necessary credentials, I started towards the East. I had interviews with the Khedive of Egypt and with the Princes and Ministers of Turkey, as well as with the renowned Enver Pasha and His Imperial Majesty the Holy Khalif, Sultan-ul-Muazzim. I settled the problem of India and the East with the Imperial Ottoman Government, and received the necessary credentials from them as well. German and Turkish officers and Maulvi Barakatullah Sahib were went with me to help me; they are still with me." Unable to take Raja Mahendra Pratap seriously, Jawaharlal Nehru later wrote in An Autobiography (p. 151): "He seemed to be a character out of medieval romance, a Don Quixote who had strayed into the twentieth century." Under pressure from the British, the Afghan government withdrew its help. The Mission was closed down.

References

Dictionary of National Biography, ed. S.P. Sen, Vol. I, pp. 139–140
The Roll of Honour, by Kalicharan Ghosh, 1965
Political Trouble in India: A Confidential Report, by James Campbell Ker, 1917, Reprint 1973
Sedition Committee Report, by Justice S.A.T. Rowlatt, 1918, Reprint 1973
Les origines intellectuelles du mouvement d’indépendance de l’Inde (1893–1918), by Prithwindra Mukherjee, PhD Thesis, 1986
In Freedom’s Quest, by Sibnarayan Ray, Vol. I, 1998
Communism in India, by Sir Cecil Kaye, compiled & edited by Subodh Roy, 1971
"The Comintern and the Indian revolutionaries in Russia in 1920s" by Sobhanlal Datta Gupta, in Calcutta Historical Journal, Vol. XVIII, No.2, 1996, pp. 151–170.

External links
Maulana Barkatullah materials in the South Asian American Digital Archive (SAADA)

1854 births
1927 deaths
Ghadar Party
Hindu–German Conspiracy
India House
Indian expatriates in Japan
Indian expatriates in the Soviet Union
Indian expatriates in the United States
Indian independence activists from Madhya Pradesh
20th-century Indian Muslims
Islam in Japan
Politicians from Bhopal
Writers from Bhopal
Indian political writers
19th-century Indian non-fiction writers
19th-century Indian politicians
20th-century Indian non-fiction writers
20th-century Indian politicians